The Kingpins was an English pop vocal group, founded in the 1950s in Dewsbury.

Career
The group made three appearances supported by Tito Burns' 6-5ers on the BBC television series Six-Five Special between 13 December 1958 and 27 December 1958, and nine appearances supported by Bob Miller and the Millermen on the BBC television series Drumbeat between 4 April 1959 and 20 June 1959, and they contributed two tracks to the LP record entitled Drumbeat that accompanied the television series, the tracks were; a cover of Bobby Freeman's "Shame On You Miss Johnson" (written by Bobby Freeman), and Bobby Tempest's Don't Leave Me (Like This) (written by Brian Bushby aka Bobby Tempest). The Kingpins were managed by Tito Burns, and in 1959 toured on The Dickie Valentine Show, with The Fraser Hayes Four, and Billie Anthony.

Brian Adams and John Putnam later left The Kingpins, and replaced Vince Hill and Johnny Worth as members of The Raindrops alongside Len Beadle and Jackie Lee.

Discography

Albums
Drumbeat Parlophone PMC1101 [mono only], 1959
Reissued twenty years later as part of Colin Miles' NUT series on EMI NUTM20
Reissued on Audio CD Label: Silva Screen ASIN: B003M4DKQM (28 Jun 2010)
Reissued with additional tracks as "Drumbeat/Saturday Club And British Hits of the Late '50s" on Audio CD Label: Jasmine Records ASIN: B003TL8MLG (23 Aug 2010)

References

External links
Brad Newman the Island Piano Man
Don't Leave Me (Like This) at last.fm
Shame on You, Miss Johnson at last.fm

English pop music groups
English vocal groups
Musical groups established in the 1950s
Musicians from Dewsbury